Miss USA 2006 was the 55th Miss USA pageant, held at the Royal Farms Arena in Baltimore, Maryland on April 21, 2006.  Fifty-one state titleholders competed for the title, which was won by Tara Conner of Kentucky.  Conner was crowned by outgoing titleholder Chelsea Cooley of North Carolina.

This was the second consecutive year that the pageant was held in Baltimore, although the venue changed from the Hippodrome Theater to the larger 1st Mariner Arena. Delegates arrived in the city on 2 April 2006, and were involved in three weeks of events, appearances and preliminary competitions before the final competition. This included a trip to New York City to attend a book launch for The Miss Universe Guide to Beauty and make media appearances on Regis and Kathy, The Early Show and Total Request Live.

The pageant hosts were Nancy O'Dell (who had hosted the pageant in 2004 and 2005) and Drew Lachey. For the first time Queer Eye for the Straight Guy star Carson Kressley provided commentary. Special guest performers were the East Village Opera Company.

The finals were broadcast by NBC, with 7.77 million viewers, the second-lowest viewership ever recorded.

The winner represented the United States at Miss Universe 2006 on July 23, 2006 in Los Angeles where she placed 4th Runner-up.

Results

Placements

Awards

Historical significance 
 Kentucky wins competition for the first time and surpasses its previous highest placement from the last year. Also becoming in the 30th state who does it for the first time.
 California earns the 1st runner-up position for the sixth time and repeats the same position as the previous year 2005.
 Georgia earns the 2nd runner-up position for the fourth time. The last time it placed this was in 2001.
 Ohio earns the 3rd runner-up position for the second time. The last time it placed this was in 1982.
 Florida earns the 4th runner-up position for the fourth time and repeats the same position as the previous year 2005.
 States that placed in semifinals the previous year were California, Florida, Illinois, Kentucky and Texas.
 Texas placed for the sixth consecutive year.
 Florida placed for the third consecutive year. 
 California, Illinois and Kentucky made their second consecutive placement.
 Alabama, Arizona, Georgia, South Carolina and Tennessee last placed in 2004.
 District of Columbia and Rhode Island last placed in 2002.
 Nevada last placed in 2001.
 Ohio last placed in 1999.
 Maine last placed in 1977.
 North Carolina breaks an ongoing streak of placements since 2004.
 Oklahoma breaks an ongoing streak of placements since 2003.

Contestants

The Miss USA 2006 delegates are:

 Alabama – Haleigh Stidham
 Alaska – Noelle Meyer
 Arizona – Brenna Sakas
 Arkansas – Kimberly Forsyth
 California – Tamiko Nash
 Colorado – Jacqueline Madera
 Connecticut – Jeannine Phillips
 Delaware – Ashlee Greenwell
 District of Columbia – Candace Allen
 Florida – Cristin Duren
 Georgia – Lisa Wilson
 Hawaii – Radasha Ho'ohuli
 Idaho – Allyson Swan
 Illinois – Catherine Warren
 Indiana – Bridget Bobel
 Iowa – Sarah Corpstein
 Kansas – Ashley Aull
 Kentucky – Tara Conner
 Louisiana – Christina Cuenca
 Maine – Katee Stearns
 Maryland – Melissa DiGiulian
 Massachusetts – Tiffany Kelly
 Michigan – Danelle Gay
 Minnesota – Dottie Cannon
 Mississippi – Kendra King
 Missouri – Kristi Capel
 Montana – Jill McLain
 Nebraska – Emily Poeschl
 Nevada – Lauren Scyphers
 New Hampshire – Krystal Barry
 New Jersey – Jessica Boyington
 New Mexico – Onawa Lacy
 New York – Adriana Diaz
 North Carolina – Samantha Holvey
 North Dakota – Kimberly Krueger
 Ohio – Stacy Offenberger
 Oklahoma – Robyn Watkins
 Oregon – Allison Machado
 Pennsylvania – Tanya Lehman
 Rhode Island – Leeann Tingley
 South Carolina – Lacie Lybrand
 South Dakota – Alexis LeVan
 Tennessee – Lauren Grissom
 Texas – Lauren Lanning
 Utah – Soben Huon
 Vermont – Amanda Gilman
 Virginia – Amber Copley
 Washington – Tiffany Doorn
 West Virginia – Jessica Wedge
 Wisconsin – Anna Piscitello
 Wyoming – Kristin George

Judges
There were two sets of judges: one for the preliminary competition (held on April 14), and another for the final night of competition (April 21).  The latter judges decided who won the Miss USA title.

Preliminary judges
Jeff Kimbell – businessman involved in lobbying, political strategy, real estate, and entertainment.
Kerry Cavanaugh – North American brand manager for CoverGirl cosmetics.
Natasha O'Dell – producer for Black Entertainment Television's Special Projects Division.
Valerie Boyce – an agent for Trump Model Management.
Arnold Williams – manager of Abrams, Foster, Nole & William (based in Pennsylvania) since 1993.
Robb Merrit – Vice President of a commercial real estate developer based in Baltimore, MD.
Rhona Gaff – Vice President at the Trump Organization and is best known as the woman who rings Apprentice candidates each morning to give candidate their directions.

Finals judges
Jillian Barberie – actress and entertainer reporter for Good Day LA.
Donny Deutsch – executive and talk show host.
Gina Drosos - Vice President and General Manager of Global Cosmetics for Procter & Gamble.
Steve Madden – founder of a footwear company that bears his name.
Nicole Linkletter – fashion model who won America's Next Top Model, Cycle 5.
Donald Trump Jr. – Executive Vice President for Development and Acquisitions and son of pageant owner Donald Trump.
James Hyde – starred as Sam Bennett on NBC's Passions for seven years.
Hines Ward – wide receiver for the Pittsburgh Steelers
Chad Hedrick –  speed skater and world record holder.

Pre-pageant specials

A pre-pageant special edition of Deal or No Deal aired on April 12 on NBC.  It included Miss USA 2005 Chelsea Cooley and twenty-six contestants, who replaced the show's models as briefcase-holders:
Haleigh Stidham (AL), Kimberly Forsyth (AR), Tamiko Nash (CA), Jeannine Phillips (CT), Ashlee Greenwell (DE), Cristin Duren (FL), Catherine Warren (IL), Bridget Bobel (IN), Tara Conner (KY), Christina Cuenca (LA), Katee Stearns (ME), Tiffany Kelly (MA), Danelle Gay (MI), Dottie Cannon, (MN), Kristi Capel (MO), Lauren Scyphers (NV), Jessica Boyington (NJ), Onawa Lacy (NM), Samantha Holvey (NC), Kimberly Krueger (ND), Tanya Lehman (PA), Leeann Tingley (RI), Lacie Lybrand (SC), Soben Huon (UT), Amber Copley (VA), Jessica Wedge (WV).

Allison Machado (OR) was the alternate.

References

External links
Official website 

2006
April 2006 events in the United States
2006 beauty pageants
2006 in Maryland